Viele or Vielé may refer to any one of the following:

People
Egbert Ludovicus Viele (1825-1902), civil engineer and US Representative from New York
Francis Vielé-Griffin (1864-1937), American-born French poet 
John L. Viele (1788-1832), New York politician
Justin Viele (born 1990), American baseball player
Herman Knickerbocker Vielé (1855-1908), American writer
Emily Vielé (b. 1866), better known as Emily Vielé Strother, American writer
 Teresa Griffin Vielé (1832–1906), American author and wife of Egbert Ludovicus Viele

See also
Vielle, a European bowed stringed instrument used in the Medieval period
La Vieille, a lighthouse in France